Sir Robert Abraham Burrows, KBE (17 March 1884 – 14 August 1964), was a British businessman and Liberal Party politician.

Background
Burrows was born the son of Miles Formby Burrows, Esq., JP, Lancs. and Gertrude Dawbarn. He was educated at The Leys School, Cambridge. In 1911, he married Eleanor Doris Bainbridge, great-granddaughter of Bainbridge's founder Emerson Muschamp Bainbridge.  Sir Robert and Lady Burrows had two sons and two daughters. In 1937 he was awarded a knighthood in the New Year's Honours. In 1952 he was awarded a KBE in the New Year's Honours for services to the disabled.

Burrows is, through his granddaughter Nikki Williams-Ellis (née Burrows), the great-grandfather of Princess Beatrice's husband Edoardo Mapelli Mozzi.

Career
Burrows was Chairman of Lancashire Associated Collieries. He was Chairman of Directors, Remploy Ltd. In July 1947, as Chairman of the  London, Midland and Scottish Railway, Burrows presented  a  display of flowers in the shape of a  "large heart" at Crewe railway station  as a  "personal tribute" to  farewell Princess Elizabeth, her fiancé  Prince Philip,  Princess Margaret, King George VI and his wife Queen Elizabeth who were leaving for Scotland  aboard the Royal Train. Through their mutual involvement  in the National Association of Boys' Clubs, Burrows enjoyed "direct contact and friendship" with  the Duke of York, (later George VI) who occasionally stayed with Burrows at his Bonis Hall home in Prestbury, Cheshire.

Political career
Burrows was Liberal candidate for the Leigh division of Lancashire at the 1923 General Election. He hoped to regain a seat lost to Labour in 1922 when his Liberal predecessor finished third. He was unsuccessful but managed to claim second place. He did not stand for parliament again.

Electoral record

He served as a Justice of the peace for the County of Lancaster. In 1940 he served as High Sheriff of Cheshire.

See also
Constituency election results in the 1923 United Kingdom general election

References

1884 births
1964 deaths
Liberal Party (UK) parliamentary candidates
People educated at The Leys School